Frederick Burbury (20 November 1861 – 20 June 1956) was an Australian politician.

He was born in Andover. In 1916, he was elected to the Tasmanian House of Assembly as a Liberal member for Franklin. He retired in 1919. Burbury died in Campbell Town in 1956.

References

1861 births
1956 deaths
Commonwealth Liberal Party politicians
Nationalist Party of Australia members of the Parliament of Tasmania
Members of the Tasmanian House of Assembly